Reinharz or Reinhartz is a surname. Notable people with the surname include:

 Adele Reinhartz (born 1953), Canadian academic
 Jehuda Reinharz (born 1944), American academic, husband of Shulamit
 Shulamit Reinharz (born 1946), American academic

See also
 Reinhart